The canton of Auterive is an administrative division of the Haute-Garonne department, southern France. Its borders were modified at the French canton reorganisation which came into effect in March 2015. Its seat is in Auterive.

It consists of the following communes:
 
Auribail
Auterive
Bax
Beaumont-sur-Lèze
Bois-de-la-Pierre
Canens
Capens
Carbonne
Castagnac
Caujac
Cintegabelle
Esperce
Gaillac-Toulza
Gensac-sur-Garonne
Goutevernisse
Gouzens
Grazac
Grépiac
Labruyère-Dorsa
Lacaugne
Lafitte-Vigordane
Lagrâce-Dieu
Lahitère
Lapeyrère
Latour
Latrape
Lavelanet-de-Comminges
Longages
Mailholas
Marliac
Marquefave
Massabrac
Mauressac
Mauzac
Miremont
Montaut
Montbrun-Bocage
Montesquieu-Volvestre
Montgazin
Noé
Peyssies
Puydaniel
Rieux-Volvestre
Saint-Christaud
Saint-Julien-sur-Garonne
Saint-Sulpice-sur-Lèze
Salles-sur-Garonne

References

Cantons of Haute-Garonne
States and territories established in 1793